Icon for Hire is an American rock band from Decatur, Illinois. Formed in 2007, the band's current lineup consists of singer Ariel Bloomer and lead guitarist Shawn Jump. They released two EPs independently before signing to Tooth & Nail Records, through which they released their first two albums: Scripted in 2011 and Icon for Hire on October 15, 2013. Their third album, You Can't Kill Us, was independently released on November 25, 2016. Their fourth album, Amorphous, was released on February 19, 2021, also independently. Their fifth independent studio album, The Reckoning, was released on September 30, 2022.

History

Origins: 2007–2009 

The band was formed in Decatur, Illinois by vocalist Ariel Bloomer and guitarist Shawn Jump. When the two met in 2007, Ariel, upon discovering that Jump played guitar, initiated a musical collaboration between the two of them. When the need for a drummer arose, Jump recruited Adam Kronshagen, an old friend he had held jam sessions with as a member of the local party scene (Jump was six months clean at the time). The band officially formed in November of that year, after bassist Joshua Davis joined. They chose their name as a satirical comment on the state of the music industry.

The band played their first show in a local club before an audience of family and friends, who gave them a positive reception. Ariel has been quoted as saying of the performance, "Our passion for music was there; whatever we lacked in sound we made up for with enthusiasm." Over the next two years, the band toured throughout the Midwest and released two EPs, the self-titled Icon for Hire EP in 2008 and The Grey EP in 2009. During that same year, Davis left the band.

Tooth & Nail, Scripted and self-titled album: 2009–2015 

In late 2009, the band was contacted by Tooth & Nail Records through Myspace. The label then sent representatives to one of the band's shows, and eventually signed them in July 2010. "We are thrilled to be joining such an established and well-respected group at Tooth & Nail," shared the band upon their signing. "It's a label that has a history of consistently putting out good music and really working side by side with their artists. Because we've been doing this thing on our own for over two years, it feels great to partner with Tooth & Nail. We can't wait to record our debut full-length and see where this road takes us." They spent the last quarter of 2010 in the studio with producers Rob Hawkins and Aaron Sprinkle recording their first full-length album, Scripted, which was released by the label on August 23, 2011. The album made it on the US Billboard charts at No. 7 for Hard Rock Albums, No. 5 for Christian Albums, No. 16 for Alternative Albums, No. 22 for Rock Albums, and No. 95 on the Billboard 200. It also sold more than 4,300 units in the first week of release and broke the record for first week sales on a Tooth & Nail debut album. The band also achieved success with the album's lead single "Make a Move", which peaked at No. 13 on R&R/Billboard's Christian Rock chart and had an accompanying music video exclusively released online by Guitar World magazine's website. Also in 2011, the band acquired bassist Josh Kincheloe.

In December 2011, Ariel stated that, while the band had been focusing on extensive touring rather than writing new music, she had "a feeling that we'll start piecing together some demos shortly." In a later interview with TVU Music channel, she revealed that the band was in the early stages of writing songs for a second album. In an interview with KHRT-FM, the band expressed their desire for the album to be "heavier....more aggressive", with more bubblegum pop production and possible hip hop elements. On August 15, 2013, Icon for Hire premiered their new single "Cynics and Critics" via lyric video and announced their second album, the self-titled Icon for Hire. The album was released on October 15, 2013, whereupon it reached No. 66 on the Billboard 200 and received largely positive reviews.

Departure from Tooth & Nail and You Can't Kill Us 2015–present 

On June 6, 2015, Icon for Hire announced that they broke their contract with Tooth & Nail records to go independent, citing creative, ideological, and technical differences with the label. They simultaneously announced that they would soon be releasing new music and released a new song, "Now You Know". "Bam Bam Pop" was also recorded.

On November 20, 2015, the band announced that Adam Kronshagen was leaving the band in order to focus on his family more, and that the band would continue.

On March 15, 2016, the band announced a Kickstarter campaign for their third album, You Can't Kill Us.  The album would be released throughout the year, with three new songs released to campaign backers every three months. The band raised $127,200, exceeding their initial goal of $2,016. "Supposed To Be" was released as the lead single from the album amongst its first group of releases, and received a music video on July 22, 2016, which was directed by Jamie Holt and included fans who donated to their Kickstarter campaign. Lead singer, Ariel, announced the album's release date of November 25. You Can't Kill Us was released on November 25, 2016, and peaked at No. 180 on the Billboard 200 chart.

On October 23, 2018, the band uploaded a video to their YouTube channel titled "Supposed To Be Acoustic Sessions Video Teaser", announcing their first video session to come soon, as well as that the Still Can't Kill Us: The Acoustic Sessions album would be released on December 7. The band released their "Supposed to Be" Acoustic Video on October 26, their "Get Well II" Acoustic Video on November 8, and "Demons" Acoustic Video on November 23. The tracks were also uploaded to Spotify as singles.

Touring 

Icon for Hire supported Red on their "Kill the Machine" tour in October 2011. They also participated in that year's Christmas Rock Night festival in Ennepetal, near Düsseldorf, Germany, along with Red and Skillet. The band toured with Jamie's Elsewhere and These Hearts in early 2012, and toured with Emery's "Emery and Friends Tour" with I Am Empire and Sent By Ravens in March 2012. They have announced a May 2012 tour with P.O.D, Red, and Love and Death.

Icon for Hire toured on LiveNation's "Ones to Watch" tour in 2013 along the side of Redlight King. Later that year, the band kicked off the "Evening With Icon for Hire" tour. The shows featured music, fashion, a pre-concert acoustic set, and an intimate Q&A with the group.

Icon For Hire appeared on all dates of Van's Warped Tour 2014 and the 2015 tour.

In October – November 2016 they were on You Can't Kill Us tour with Stitched Up Heart.

From February to May 2018 the band was on a worldwide Turn Your Pain into Art tour with Riot Child as opening act in Europe.

In October – November 2019 the band went on a US tour with Veridia and Amy Guess.

From February to March 2020 was on the "Icon Army Tour" in Europe, starting in Moscow, Russia, on February 20 and planned to end in Milan with Italian band Halflives as opening act. Due to the spread of COVID-19 in Europe and the announcement of COVID-19 lockdowns in Italy on 9 March 2020, Icon for Hire was forced to cancel their last shows in Zurich, Switzerland (due to happen on March 12, 2020) and Milan (March 13, 2020) and to return to the United States of America.

On April 27, 2022, Icon For Hire announced their headlining "Ready for Combat" tour from June - July 2022 with Sumo Cyco and Awake At Last.

On September 2, 2022, Finnish band The Rasmus announced their "Live and Never Die '22" tour in 21 cities across Europe, citing Icon for Hire as their opening act throughout the tour. This would be the first time Icon for Hire returns to Europe after the COVID-19 pandemic. On October 20th, only ten days into the tour, Icon for Hire announced they would be cancelling all remaining shows citing "growing economic concerns in Europe" and "airline misplacement of music gear", resulting in an unexpected and unplanned increase in costs.

Musical style and influences 

The band's sound combines pop punk and alternative metal elements with strings and electronics. Jamie Maxwell of Cross Rhythms describes them as a punk band, but notes that "the electronic influence evident in some of their tracks is a definite nod to the likes of Linkin Park and others in the nu metal mould." In describing the band's sound, lead singer Ariel has said that the band is "first and foremost just a rock band. That's where our roots are and where our hearts are. But a few years ago we started really getting into synths and programming. We love the combination of brutal, in-your-face riffs, with the fun candy of pop production sprinkled all over it."

Influences cited by the band have included hard rock bands like Linkin Park, Breaking Benjamin, Pantera, Mötley Crüe, and Rage Against the Machine, as well as pop- and hip hop-oriented artists such as Skrillex, The Black Eyed Peas, Dessa, and Lady Gaga.

Comparisons to other rock bands 

The band's sound has often been compared to that of other female-fronted rock bands, particularly Paramore. Nathaniel Schexnayder of Jesus Freak Hideout went so far as to label the band's debut album Scripted as generic, saying that the band "borrows their elements from other female fronted acts like Flyleaf, Fireflight, and Paramore at an alarming degree." Ariel has taken issue with these comparisons, citing the band's "unique combination of programming/pop elements, mixed with a commercial rock sound" as a distinguishing element, in addition to the band's live performances: "We've never had someone come see us live and compare us to other bands." She has also noted such comparisons as unfairly discriminatory: "It frustrates me how in so many other industries you are acknowledged for your skill and education, but in music somehow if you're a chick you better be bringing something extraordinarily mind-blowing to the table in order to have a shot. It's a bit sexist I think." Their song "Now You Know" addresses the subject at length.

Religious affiliation 

Icon for Hire have had complicated relations with the Christian music market as they are not categorized as a Christian band. Ariel stated that they do not play music for Christians but to "save the world" and that they try to distance themselves from identifying as part of the Christian music industry to avoid pushing non-Christians away from hearing that message. Despite this, several writers have identified Icon for Hire as part of the Christian music scene, and some critics have noted references to the members' Christian faith in their lyrics. David Jeffries pointed out that "Christian ideals are the driving force" in the lyrics on Scripted, though he acknowledged that "you could look at this as a secular rebellion against the mopey 'scene' bands and still thrill at Icon for Hire's fresh attitude and sense of purpose." Schexnayder, while admitting that "the group doesn't wear their faith on their sleeve in their messages", noted a general encouraging message on the album and singled out the song "The Grey" as containing "spiritual references". Kim Jones of About.com said that the categorization was inaccurate "if you're looking to use the term to put them into a nice and safe box, limited to only a Christian audience."

Band members 

Current members
 Ariel Bloomer – lead vocals (2007–present)
 Shawn Jump – guitars, keyboards (2007–present)

Former members
 Joshua Davis – bass guitar, unclean vocals (2007–2009)
 Adam Kronshagen – drums (2007–2015, 2016)

Touring musicians
 Josh Kincheloe – bass guitar, backing vocals (2011–2016)
 Shane Wise – drums (2016)
 Ryan Seaman – drums (2017–2018)

Discography

Studio albums

Extended plays

Singles

Promotional singles

Music videos

Compilation contributions 

Non-album songs
 "Conversation with a Rockstar"
 "Sno"
 "Perfect Storm" later released as "War"
 "One Million Ways"

References 

Musicians from Decatur, Illinois
Alternative rock groups from Illinois
Hard rock musical groups from Illinois
American alternative metal musical groups
Tooth & Nail Records artists
Christian punk groups
Musical groups established in 2007
Female-fronted musical groups